Federal Agrotechnical School of Satuba
Federal Agrotechnical School of Manaus
Federal Agrotechnical School of São Gabriel da Cachoeira
Federal Agrotechnical School of Catú
Federal Agrotechnical School of Guanambí
Federal Agrotechnical School of Santa Inês
Federal Agrotechnical School of Senhor do Bonfim
Federal Agrotechnical School of Crato
Federal Agrotechnical School of Iguatú
Federal Agrotechnical School of Alegre
Federal Agrotechnical School of Colatina
Federal Agrotechnical School of Santa Teresa
Federal Agrotechnical School of Ceres
Federal Agrotechnical School of Rio Verde
Federal Agrotechnical School of Urutaí
Federal Agrotechnical School of Codó
Federal Agrotechnical School of São Luís
Federal Agrotechnical School of Bambuí
Federal Agrotechnical School of Barbacena
Federal Agrotechnical School of Inconfidentes
Federal Agrotechnical School of Januária
Federal Agrotechnical School of Machado
Federal Agrotechnical School of Muzambinho
Federal Agrotechnical School of Rio Pomba
Federal Agrotechnical School of Salinas
Federal Agrotechnical School of São João Evangelista
Federal Agrotechnical School of Uberaba
Federal Agrotechnical School of Uberlândia
Federal Agrotechnical School of Cáceres
Federal Agrotechnical School of Cuiabá
Federal Agrotechnical School of Castanhal
Federal Agrotechnical School of Sousa
Federal Agrotechnical School of Barreiros
Federal Agrotechnical School of Belo Jardim
Federal Agrotechnical School of Vitória de Santo Antão
Federal Agrotechnical School of Colorado do Oeste
Federal Agrotechnical School of Rio do Sul
Federal Agrotechnical School of Alegrete
Federal Agrotechnical School of Bento Gonçalves
Federal Agrotechnical School of São Vicente do Sul
Federal Agrotechnical School of Sertão
Federal Agrotechnical School of Concórdia
Federal Agrotechnical School of Sombrio
Federal Agrotechnical School of São Cristóvão
Federal Agrotechnical School of Araguatins

See also
Federal institutions of Brazil

Federal Agrotechnical
Federal Agrotechnical